Rhinella arborescandens is a species of toad in the family Bufonidae. It is endemic to Peru and only known from its type locality near Mendoza, northern Cordillera Central, in the Amazonas Region. It is unusual among Rhinella toads because it is arboreal, hence the specific name arborescandens, derived from Latin arbor for tree and scando meaning to climb.

Description
Rhinella arborescandens is a small and robust-bodied toad. The dorsum is reddish brown, and the male had a pale yellow mid-dorsal stripe. The parotoid gland is ovoid. The cranial crests are absent, as is the tympanum. The skin bears evenly distributed, small tubercles.

Habitat and conservation
The natural habitat of Rhinella arborescandens is montane tropical rainforest. The location is unprotected, but the threats to this little known species are unknown.

References

arborescandens
Amphibians of the Andes
Amphibians of Peru
Endemic fauna of Peru
Amphibians described in 1992
Taxa named by William Edward Duellman
Taxonomy articles created by Polbot